Sukma is a town in Sukma district in Chhattisgarh,  India.

Geography

Location
Sukma is connected to Jagdalpur by National Highway 30.

Transport

The only transport systems available are in the form of road transport. Buses play a major role in public transportation, and are available for Raipur, Hyderabad, Bhilai, Bilaspur, Vijaywada, Jagdalpur, Visakhapatnam. Other modes of road transport include jeeps and taxis. 

The nearest rail head is at Dantewada, while the nearest airport is in Jagdalpur.

Naxalite activity

Sukma district is a part of the "Red corridor", It is one of the most militarized districts in the country with deployment of over 10,000 personal, this region in India primarily affected by the Naxalite–Maoist insurgency. This region has been under continuous attack by the Maoists, who often targeted police personnel, military forces, and political leaders. Some of the most well-known incidents around Sukma during this insurgency include the 2013 Naxalite attack in Darbha valley, the 2017 Sukma attack, and the 2018 Sukma attack.

References

External links
 About Sukma
 Satellite image of Sukma

Sukma district
Cities and towns in Sukma district